Borussia Dortmund is a German football club based in Dortmund, North Rhine-Westphalia. The team plays in the Bundesliga – the highest tier in the German football league system. The club was founded in 1909.

The following is a list of the players with the most first team appearances and goals for the club. This consists of appearances and goals in the Bundesliga, 2. Bundesliga North, Regionalliga West, DFB-Pokal, DFL-Ligapokal, DFL-Supercup, European Cup / UEFA Champions League, UEFA Cup / UEFA Europa League, UEFA Super Cup, UEFA Cup Winners' Cup, Intercontinental Cup, Oberliga West and the finals of the German football championship.

Most appearances
The following list includes players who have made at least 30 appearances for the club.

Bold signifies current Borussia Dortmund players.

Statistics correct as of 18 March 2023.

Top goalscorers

The following list includes players who have scored at least 30 goals for the club.

Bold signifies current Borussia Dortmund player.

Statistics correct as of 18 March 2023.

Youngest goalscorers
The following table lists the ten youngest goalscorers.

Bold signifies current Borussia Dortmund player.

Club captains

Bold signifies current Borussia Dortmund player.

World Cup winning players
The following players won the FIFA World Cup while playing for Borussia Dortmund.
  Heinz Kwiatkowski (Switzerland 1954)
  Frank Mill (Italy 1990)
  Andreas Möller (Italy 1990)
  Erik Durm (Brazil 2014)
  Kevin Großkreutz (Brazil 2014)
  Mats Hummels (Brazil 2014)
  Roman Weidenfeller (Brazil 2014)

Player Honours
The following players won these awards while playing for Borussia Dortmund.

References
 ''Borussia Dortmund legends ''- A list of BVB greatest players
 
 

Players
Borussia Dortmund
Association football player non-biographical articles